Ferozepur Jhirka Assembly constituency is one of the 90 constituencies in the Haryana Legislative Assembly of Haryana a north state of India. Ferozepur Jhirka is also part of Gurgaon Lok Sabha constituency.

Members of Legislative Assembly

Election Results

2019

See also

 Ferozepur Jhirka
 Mewat district
 List of constituencies of Haryana Legislative Assembly

References

Assembly constituencies of Haryana
Nuh district